is a Japanese modern pentathlete. He competed at the 1976 and 1984 Summer Olympics.

References

External links
 

1949 births
Living people
Japanese male modern pentathletes
Olympic modern pentathletes of Japan
Modern pentathletes at the 1976 Summer Olympics
Modern pentathletes at the 1984 Summer Olympics
20th-century Japanese people
21st-century Japanese people